Hadmatiya is a village in the Rajkot district of the Indian state of Gujarat located  from the city of Jamnagar.

Demographics
As of 2010, Hadmatiya had a population of 12,000, of whom 60 per cent were male and 40 per cent female. Male literacy is 85 per cent, and female literacy 75 per cent giving an average literacy rate of 80 per cent. Five per cent of the population is under six years of age while 70 per cent of the people live in city areas such as Jamnagar, Rajkot, Surat and Mumbai amongst others leaving 30% resident in Hadmatiya.

Culture
All residents of Hadmatiya are Gujarati and speak Gujarati language. Kathiawadi, a variety of Gujarati, is widely used for day to day communication. Major communities include Patels, Rajputs (Darbars), Sathwara (Dalvadi), Ahirs (Yadav),  Bhanushalis, Mers, Jains and Lohanas etc.

In Hadmatiya 75 per cent of people are  Rajputs (Darbars) while 5 per cent belong to other castes.

Religion
Hadmatiya contains several ancient and archeologically important temples, such as Ram Choro in the center of the town along with the Mahadev (Shiv) Temple, Ghodakhara Pir, Bhathiji Maharaj Temple (Vachhada dada), as well as many more small temples.

In Hadmatiya 60 per cent of the people believe in Shuddhadvaita (Vishnu), 30 per cent are followers of Swaminarayan Sampraday, while 10 per cent believe in all Hindu religions.

Economy
Hadmatiya's main activity is agriculture with 98 per cent of people owning their own land. Most of them are engaged in farming, producing main crops such as ground nuts, bajra, cotton, and sesame seeds. There is also a brass industry in Jamnagar employing 20 per cent of the local people as well as diamond business in Surat that employs 10 per cent. Other business such as clothing showrooms, stationary and retail shops account for a further 35 per cent. The service sector employs 5 per cent of Hadmatiya's people who are employed as managers, consultants and accountants amongst other professions. The remaining 30 per cent of the population are involved in agriculture.

References

Villages in Jamnagar district